Trachelipus dimorphus is a species of woodlouse in the genus Trachelipus belonging to the family Trachelipodidae that can be found in Romania, Kosovo, Montenegro, Serbia and Vojvodina.

References

External links

Trachelipodidae
Woodlice of Europe
Crustaceans described in 1941